is a Japanese composer, arranger and music producer best known for her work on the soundtracks of anime series, video games, television dramas and movies. She has written scores for Cowboy Bebop, Terror in Resonance, Ghost in the Shell: Stand Alone Complex, Wolf's Rain and Darker than Black. Kanno is also a keyboardist and the frontwoman for the Seatbelts, who perform many of her compositions.

Biography

Early life 
Yoko Kanno was born on March 18, 1963, in Sendai, Miyagi Prefecture, Japan. Her earliest experiences with music came from attending church with her parents. She studied keyboard from a young age on both the piano in her home and the organ at her kindergarten. In elementary school, she began participating in composition contests, but in high school, Kanno began to take more of an interest in literature than in music.

Kanno attended Waseda University, where she majored in literature, but she transcribed music for various student groups at Waseda in her free time. During this time, Kanno—whose parents had only allowed her to listen to classical music—was introduced to rhythm by a friend who played drums in a school band. She spoke of this experience in an interview with Akihiro Tomita:

While with this band, she studied the composition and style of popular music.

While at Waseda, the Japanese video game company Koei asked Kanno to compose the soundtrack to Nobunaga's Ambition. The game turned out to be a hit, and Kanno's music career was launched.

Professional life 
Yoko Kanno's soundtrack themes include "Kiseki no Umi" (Lodoss War), "Voices" (Macross Plus), "Tank!" (Cowboy Bebop), "Yakusoku wa Iranai" (Escaflowne), "Gravity" (Wolf's Rain), "Inner Universe" (Ghost in the Shell: Stand Alone Complex) and Stand Alone Complex O.S.T. In regards to making the Stand Alone Complex soundtrack, she said:

Having composed in various genres, including blues, classical, jazz, techno and J-pop, she was once asked if she favored a particular genre:

Since she works in the animation industry, she only receives instructions and storyboards from directors which helps her with composing. However, it is uncertain if all of her works are to be included in the finished project. She once said that this is a way she likes to work, for she does not have to deal with rules during composing. In reference to this, she once stated:

She was the lead member of the project band called Seatbelts, which regrouped in the year of 2004 to compose the soundtrack of the PlayStation 2 Cowboy Bebop video game, released in Japan in 2005.

She has composed for Koei games released during the late 1980s to early 1990s and for Napple Tale, a Dreamcast game. Due to her close involvement in the Cowboy Bebop anime, the game released by Bandai also features her work.

Apart from anime and games, Kanno also composes for live-action films and television commercials. Some popular brands she has composed for are Canon, DoCoMo, Fuji Xerox, 7-Eleven, Microsoft, Nissan, Toyota, Shiseido, Avon and MasterCard to name a few. Contributions to films started in the 1990s but only since 2002 has there been a trend towards the medium, with some of the latter being shown in international film festivals.

She attended Otakon and Anime Expo in 1999, as well as Anime Expo New York in 2002. In 2010, she made a surprise appearance at Anime Expo. Yoko Kanno performed her solo PianoMe concert at Otakon 2013.

She composed a three-movement suite, entitled "Ray of Water," for the ascension of Emperor Naruhito. It was performed for him and Empress Masako at the enthronement celebration on November 9, 2019. Yoshikazu Okada wrote the lyrics for the vocal portion, which was performed at the celebration by the idol group, Arashi.

Connection to Gabriela Robin
On many of Kanno's tracks, a woman named "Gabriela Robin" was credited as a lyricist and vocalist, but whenever these songs were performed in concert, either Maaya Sakamoto or Origa would perform them instead. In a 2009 written interview, Robin proclaimed that she would perform for the first time live at Kanno's 2009 Tanabata Sonic concert, but at the end of the concert, which featured Kanno directing the Warsaw Philharmonic, Kanno turned to the audience and sang "Moon", a song previously attributed to Robin from the Turn A Gundam soundtrack, revealing that "Gabriela Robin" was simply a pseudonym Kanno used to write songs mixing English and Japanese freely. In a later interview, Kanno said she had picked the name because the first orchestral recording she had heard was the Israel Philharmonic Orchestra, and at the time Yitzhak Rabin served as Israel's Prime Minister.

Personal life 
In addition to Japanese, she speaks a little English and some French, but claims that her English is "poor" and she needs translation help to converse in French. In regards to spirituality and religion, she said:

Besides music, Kanno also enjoys photography and writing. She has written a number of journals for Newtype magazine of which photos for illustrations are done by Kanno herself as well, and a selection of photos taken by Kanno of her protégé and former production partner Maaya Sakamoto were featured in the special event program for Sakamoto's 2010 thirtieth birthday concert at Nippon Budokan.

In 2011, Kanno expressed her support and wishes to the victims of the 2011 Tōhoku earthquake and tsunami, composing a song titled . Later, she composed NHK's official support song on the occasion of the first anniversary of the earthquake entitled , including lyrics by Sendai film director Shunji Iwai. The song features notable natives from the affected areas of Miyagi, Fukushima and Iwate.

Discography

Studio albums

Other involvements

Works

Anime

Video games

Television dramas

Movies

Publicly commissioned works

Commercial music 
Companies that have commissioned Kanno for commercial music.

 AEON
 AGF Maxim
 Ajinomoto
 Asahi Glass Co.
 Avon
 Cafe Noevir
 Citizen Watch Co.
 Canon
 Cosmo Oil
 Daikin
 Daio Paper
 Daiwa House
 FamilyMart
 Fancl
 Fuji Xerox
 Fujitsu
 Google
 Glico
 Gravity
 Half Century More
 Haus Ten Bausch
 Hisamitsu
 Hitachi
 House
 IBM
 Japan Medical Association
 Japan Railways
 Japan Telecom
 J-Phone
 Kanebo
 KDDI
 Kirin Beverage
 Kincho
 Kubota
 MasterCard International
 Meiji
 Microsoft
 Mister Donut
 Mitsubishi Heavy Industries
 Mitsui Home
 Morinaga
 Nagatanien
 National Ionity Nanocare
 Nikon
 Nintendo
 Nissan
 NTT DoCoMo
 Ono Pharmaceutical
 Otsuka Pharmaceutical Co.
 Pioneer
 Platinum Guild International
 Pola
 Seiko Epson
 Sekisui House
 Seven Eleven
 Sharp
 Shimura
 Shiseido
 Sony
 Suntory
 Taiyo Life Insurance
 Takano Yori Beauty Clinic
 Tepco
 Tirol Choco
 Tokyo Gas
 Tokyo Metro
 Tombow Pencil
 Toyota
 Try Group
 UFJ Bank
 Vodafone
 Yukiguni Maitake

Hired vocalists 
Artists who have performed at least one of Kanno's vocal tracks.

  Aceilux
 Afra
 Aimer
  Aki Okui
 AKINO
 Akino Arai
 Anna Tsuchiya
 Aoi Teshima
 Arnór Dan Arnarson
  Artur Stefanowicz
  Ben del Maestro
  Carla Vallet
  Chinatsu Yamamoto
  Chiyono Yoshino
 Chris Mosdell
  Cosmic Voices from Bulgaria
 Crystal Kay
 Donna Burke
  Egil Olsen
 Emily Bindiger
 Emily Curtis
 Etsuko Yakushimaru
  Feather and Down
  Franco Sansalone
 Hajime Chitose
  Hanna Berglind
  Hassan Bohmide
 Heartsdales
 Hitomi Mieno
 Ilaria Graziano
  Jadwiga Rappe'
  James Wendt
 Joyce
  Kaoru Nishino
 Kei Kobayashi
  Kyoko Endo
  Kyoko Katsunuma 
 Kyōko Koizumi
 Makino Yui
 Mari Iijima
  Maryanne Murray
 May'n
 Maaya Sakamoto
 Mai Yamane
 Masaaki Endoh
  Masayoshi Furukawa
 Megumi Nakajima
 Mem Nahadr
 Miki Imai
 Motohiro Hata
 Origa
 Pierre Bensusan
 POP ETC
 Raiché Coutev Sisters
  Raj Ramayya
  Reynada Hill
  Ryo Nagano
 Scott Matthew
  Seika Iwashita
 Shanti Snyder
  Soichiro Otsuka
 Steve Conte
  Sydney Thiam
 Tim Jensen
 Tokiko Kato
 Tulivu-Donna Cumberbatch
 WISE
 Wuyontana
 YOSHIKA
 YUKI
 Yuho Iwasato
 Yuuki Ozaki

References

External links 
 Yoko Kanno discography at VGMdb
 
 

1963 births
20th-century Japanese composers
20th-century women composers
20th-century women pianists
Anime composers
Bebop composers
Blues musicians
Japanese music arrangers
Japanese television composers
Japanese women film score composers
Japanese women pianists
Japanese women record producers
Living people
Musicians from Miyagi Prefecture
Victor Entertainment artists
Video game composers
Waseda University alumni
Women television composers